Herbert Graham "Bert" Pratten (22 April 1892 – 11 September 1979) was an Australian cricketer. A right-handed batsman, he played first-class cricket for New South Wales between 1913 and 1915.

Biography
Pratten was born in Sydney on 22 April 1892. His father Herbert Edward Pratten was a jam manufacturer who was later elected to federal parliament and served as a cabinet minister.

Pratten made his first-class debut for New South Wales against Queensland in November 1913, also playing a minor match against Ipswich and West Moreton the same month.

In 1914, after another first-class match against Queensland and a minor match against Toowoomba, Pratten played his first Sheffield Shield match against South Australia in December. He also played against Victoria that month before playing his final first-class match against South Australia in January 1915. He played a match for the Federated Malay States against the Straits Settlements in 1919 and died in Neutral Bay on 11 September 1979.

See also
 List of New South Wales representative cricketers

References

1892 births
1979 deaths
Cricketers from Sydney
Australian cricketers
Federated Malay States cricketers
New South Wales cricketers